They Stand Accused (also known as Cross Question) is an American dramatized court show broadcast on the now-defunct DuMont Television Network from September 11, 1949, to October 5, 1952 and again from September 9 to December 30, 1954.

Overview
The series was recorded in a courtroom presided over by attorney Charles Johnston and broadcast live from Chicago's WGN-TV, with jurors chosen from the studio audience. On most DuMont affiliates, They Stand Accused aired Sundays at 9pm ET during the 1949-1950 television season, then Sundays at 10pm ET, and then Thursdays at 8pm ET during 1954.

William C. Wines, assistant attorney general of Illinois, wrote the program's dramatizations.

Reception
Reviewer Jack Gould wrote in The New York Times that They Stand Accused was "one of the more remarkable and consistently absorbing programs on television". He complimented the program's combination of documentary and dramatic styles and its way of having a natural appearance despite its "careful preparation".

Episode status

At least two episodes exist: the December 23, 1950, episode is held in the J. Fred MacDonald collection at the Library of Congress, while an episode from late 1954 ("The Johnny Roberts Story") can be viewed online at the Internet Archive.

See also
 List of programs broadcast by the DuMont Television Network
 List of surviving DuMont Television Network broadcasts
 1949-50 United States network television schedule
 1950-51 United States network television schedule
 1951-52 United States network television schedule
 1954-55 United States network television schedule

References

Bibliography
 David Weinstein, The Forgotten Network: DuMont and the Birth of American Television (Philadelphia: Temple University Press, 2004) 
 Alex McNeil, Total Television, Fourth edition (New York: Penguin Books, 1980) 
 Tim Brooks and Earle Marsh, The Complete Directory to Prime Time Network TV Shows, Third edition (New York: Ballantine Books, 1964)

External links
 
 DuMont historical website
 Late-1954 episode "The Johnny Roberts Story" at the Internet Archive
They Stand Accused at CVTA

1949 American television series debuts
1954 American television series endings
American crime television series
American legal drama television series
Black-and-white American television shows
DuMont Television Network original programming
English-language television shows
Dramatized court shows
American live television series